The  is a translation and commentary of the Bhagavad Gita by A. C. Bhaktivedanta Swami Prabhupada, founder of the International Society for Krishna Consciousness (ISKCON), commonly known as the Hare Krishna movement. This translation of Bhagavad Gita  emphasizes a path of devotion toward the personal God, Krishna. It was first published in 1968 in English by Macmillan Publishers, and is now available in nearly sixty languages. It is primarily promoted and distributed by followers of ISKCON.

Contents
For each verse, the book (in complete editions) includes the Devanagari script, a Latin transliteration, word-for-word Sanskrit-English meanings, and English translation. An extensive commentary by Prabhupada is given throughout, based on various Gaudiya Vaishnava works, including: Ramanuja Bhasya (in Sanskrit); Sarartha-varsini-tika (Sanskrit) by Visvanatha Chakravarti Thakura; Gita-bhusana-tika (Sanskrit) by Baladeva Vidyabhushana; and Bhaktivinode Thakur's Bengali commentaries.

The narrative in the  concerns a dialogue between Lord Krishna and a mighty warrior named Arjuna on the battlefield of Kurukshetra.  In the narrative, Lord Krishna has descended to earth to aid Arjuna in his battle against Kauravas and their army.  Lord Krishna assumes the role of Arjuna's chariot driver and aids him in the battle and reveals to Arjuna several divine truths about human existence in the material plane, the true nature of the supreme personality of God, and the method of eternal progression and release from the earthly cycles of death and rebirth through the practice of bhakti yoga.  The narrative teaches that achieving Krishna consciousness and attaining the inner realization that all life is a manifestation of the eternal energy of Krishna will release an individual soul from the cycles of reincarnation (death and rebirth).  The narrative culminates with Krishna revealing to Arjuna his universal form which encompasses all life and material existence.  One notable event in the narrative is when Arjuna gazes at the opposing army and sees his relatives fighting for the opposing army, he is filled with grief and remorse that he must kill his own flesh and blood.  In reply, Krishna reveals his true form to Arjuna and tells him that it does not matter if his relatives die in the battle today because they will eventually die anyway, and that Arjuna's duty to the supreme lord and his own self-realization transcends his material attachments to his relatives.  The central message of the text is that nothing ever truly dies and that all life is in a continual cycle of death and rebirth, and that one has a duty to the process of self-realization and progression in order to manifest the supreme personality of God and achieve Krishna Consciousness, thereby escaping the eternal cycles of death and rebirth.

The book advocates the path of bhakti toward Krishna, who is seen as the Supreme Personality of Godhead Himself. It establishes that Krishna is not an incarnation, but the cause of all causes and source of all incarnations. He is even the cause of Vishnu. It teaches the loving service of the transcendental personality of the Lord.

 is written in the tradition of Gaudiya Vaishnavism. Followers of the Vedas regard the Bhagavad Gita as the essence of the Vedic knowledge and the Upanishads, and  consider the book authoritative and literally true.

Some abridged editions of the Gita come with prefaces by the poet Allen Ginsberg and the theologian Thomas Merton. The 1972 Macmillan "Complete Edition" includes a Foreword by Professor Edward C. Dimock, Jr. from the University of Chicago.

Substance
 suggests a way of life for the contemporary Western world, and is derived from the Manu Smriti and other books of Hindu religious and social law. In this way of life, ideal human society is described as being divided into four varnas (brahmana – intellectuals, kshatriya – administrators, vaishya – merchants, shudra – workers). Within his writings, Prabhupada supports the view that one becomes a member of one of the varnas, not by one's birth (lineage), but by one's personal qualities and the type of work (karma) one actually performs (BG 4.13). Society is described as best ruled by a benevolent kshatriya sovereign, who is to govern according to rules set by scriptural tradition and preserved by self-controlled and pure-hearted spiritual leaders (brahmanas). The kshatriya sovereign (like courts in many democratic states) may also order capital punishment.

Brahmanas, elders, women, children and cows are said to deserve special protection, with animals, especially cows, being preserved from slaughter at all costs. Prabhupada encouraged readers to adopt a lacto-vegetarian diet and gives agriculture as the ideal economic basis of society. Prabhupada concluded that the society should be "Krishna conscious"—enlightened by devotion (bhakti) to Krishna (God).

Edition history
A. C. Bhaktivedanta Swami Prabhupada, the author, arrived in the United States in 1965. In 1966, he had founded the International Society for Krishna Consciousness (ISKCON) in a storefront at 26 2nd. Ave, New York City. At that time, he was very anxious to publish his Bhagavad-gita As It Is.  Macmillan Publishers agreed to publish a 400-page version in 1968, but the original manuscript was over 1000 pages, so the first Macmillan edition was known as  the "Abridged Edition".

By 1972, the "Abridged Edition" sales were substantial, and Macmillan agreed to publish the "Complete Edition".

In 1983, the Bhaktivedanta Book Trust (BBT) published the "Revised and Enlarged" edition containing at least one thousand substantial changes. The changes were justified as being "closer to the original manuscript". This edition has been very controversial among the followers of Srila Prabhupada.

In 2001, Krishna Books Inc (KBI), who are licensed by the BBT, reprinted the 1972 "Complete Edition", so now both the "Complete" and "Revised and Enlarged" editions are available.

Distribution
Prabhupada's translation is sold outside India due to the efforts of Hare Krishna members on the streets, in airports, and in other public places. The book also enjoys brisk sales within India. It has been published in fifty-nine languages, including French, German, Danish, Spanish, Dutch, Portuguese, Italian, Swedish, Russian, Polish, Czech, Slovak, Latvian, Ukrainian, Macedonian,  Bulgarian, Hungarian, Georgian, Croatian, Chinese, Japanese, Arabic, Hebrew, Persian, Nepali, Hindi, Bengali, Assamese, Gujarati, Kannada,
Marathi, Malayalam, Odia, Tamil, and Telugu.

Trial

In June 2011, a group linked to the Russian Orthodox Church had demanded a ban owing to an alleged "conflict of interests" between the Russian followers of Krishna and local authorities in the Siberian region of Tomsk. The case was dismissed by a federal judge on 28 December 2011.

Russian ambassador Alexander Kadakin condemned the "madmen" seeking the ban, underlining that Russia was a secular country:

About 15,000 Indians in Moscow and followers of ISKCON in Russia asked the Indian government to intervene to resolve the issue. The move triggered strong protests by Members of Parliament as they wanted the Indian Government to take up the matter strongly with Russia. The final hearing in the Tomsk district court was then scheduled on 28 December, with the court agreeing to seek the opinion of the Russian Ombudsman on human rights in the Tomsk region as well as Indologists from Moscow and St Petersburg. The prosecutor's office filed an appeal against the judge's ruling, but on March 21, 2012, the appeal court upheld the decision of the lower court, rejecting the prosecutor's petition.

Notes

References

External links
 Bhagavad-Gita As It Is editions (Worldcat)
 Bhagavad-Gita As It Is edits

1968 books
Bhagavad Gita
Books by A. C. Bhaktivedanta Swami Prabhupada
International Society for Krishna Consciousness texts
Macmillan Publishers books
Vaishnavism